David Peter Williams  (born December 1968) is a British civil servant who has served as the permanent under-secretary of state for defence since April 2021, succeeding Stephen Lovegrove. He served as the second permanent secretary at the Department of Health and Social Care since the beginning of the COVID-19 outbreak in the United Kingdom in March 2020.

Prior to his current role, Williams served in various other administrative positions in both the Department of Health and Social Care and Ministry of Defence since 2015. He is a policy leaders fellow at the University of Cambridge's Centre for Science and Policy.

He was appointed Companion of the Order of the Bath (CB) in the 2020 New Year Honours "for services to Government Finances."

References

1968 births
Living people
Permanent Under-Secretaries of State for Defence
English civil servants
Companions of the Order of the Bath